|-
! style="background-color: #FFFFC0;" colspan="2" | Astrometry
|- style="vertical-align: top;"
| Distance 
| 18,000 Ly

PSR J1748−2446ad is the fastest-spinning pulsar known, at 716 Hz (times per second), or 43,000 revolutions per minute. This pulsar was discovered by Jason W. T. Hessels of McGill University on November 10, 2004 and confirmed on January 8, 2005.

If the neutron star is assumed to contain less than two times the mass of the Sun, within the typical range of neutron stars, its radius is constrained to be less than 16 km.  At its equator it is spinning at approximately 24% of the speed of light, or over 70,000 km per second.

The pulsar is located in a globular cluster of stars called Terzan 5, located approximately 18,000 light-years from Earth in the constellation Sagittarius. It is part of a binary system and undergoes regular eclipses with an eclipse magnitude of about 40%. Its orbit is highly circular, with a 26-hour period. The other object in the system is at least 0.14 solar masses, with a radius of 5–6 solar radii. Hessels et al. state that the companion may be a "bloated main-sequence star, possibly still filling its Roche Lobe". Hessels et al. go on to speculate that gravitational radiation from the pulsar might be detectable by LIGO.

See also 

 PSR J0901–4046 longest period pulsar known
 PSR J0952–0607 second-fastest-spinning pulsar known

References

External links
 XTE J1739−285, Integral points to the fastest spinning neutron star 
 Evolution of millisecond pulsars

18
Sagittarius (constellation)
2004